Robert Rodie Dalrymple (2 January 1880 – 26 July 1970) was a Scottish footballer who played as an inside forward.

Early life
Dalrymple was born in Paisley.

Playing career
He began his career with Westmarch before joining local Scottish Football League Second Division club Abercorn. In 1902, he moved to Edinburgh to play for First Division side Heart of Midlothian. Having spent time with Kilbarchan on loan, Dalrymple scored on his debut for Hearts in a 1–1 draw with Edinburgh rivals Hibernian on 11 October 1902. He went on to score two more goals that season, in a league game against Morton and a Scottish Cup tie at Ayr. Having helped the club reach the 1903 Scottish Cup Final, he played in a 1–1 draw against Rangers at Celtic Park on 11 April 1903 and the replay one week later, which also ended in a draw. Dalrymple received a runners-up medal after Hearts lost the second replay by two goals to nil on 25 April 1903, with 32,000 spectators in attendance. He moved to England in the summer of 1903, joining Plymouth Argyle ahead of the club's first season in professional football. He made his debut in a 1–0 win at West Ham United on 1 September 1903, and scored his first goal at the end of the month as the club defeated Portsmouth 3–1.

A versatile player, Dalrymple scored the club's first goal in the FA Cup and scored a second later in the game as Argyle defeated Whiteheads by seven goals to nil in the first qualifying round. He finished the season with 17 goals scored in all competitions, having made 43 appearances. The following season, he was among the goals in the FA Cup again, earning Argyle a 1–1 draw at Newcastle United in the first round on 4 February 1905. He scored a further 12 goals in league competition, including a brace in a 4–1 win against Southampton, and won his first major title at the end of the season as the club were crowned Western Football League champions. He moved back to Scotland in the summer of 1905, having scored 30 goals in 92 appearances for Plymouth Argyle, to sign for Rangers. He made his debut on 19 August 1905 as they defeated Kilmarnock by three goals to two at Ibrox Stadium. He scored his first goal in the return match at Kilmarnock on 6 January 1906, which Rangers won 3–1, and scored a hat-trick two weeks later in a 4–0 home win against Port Glasgow Athletic.

In the Scottish Cup, Dalrymple scored a brace in victories against Arthurlie and Aberdeen. He made 18 appearances in his one season with the club, scoring 8 goals. Dalrymple returned to England in 1906, where he spent a season back in the Southern Football League with Portsmouth. The following year, he joined Fulham ahead of their first season in The Football League. He scored 44 goals in 106 appearances over the next three years, and helped the club reach the semi-finals of the FA Cup in 1908, where they were beaten 6–0 by Newcastle United at Anfield. In 1910, he moved to Clapton Orient and spent the next 9 years there, scoring 38 goals in 139 league games. He finished his career back in the Southern League with Welsh side Ton Pentre.

Personal life
Dalrymple served as a sergeant in the Football Battalion of the Middlesex Regiment during the First World War. He died on 26 July 1970.

Honours
Plymouth Argyle
Western League: 1904–05

Career statistics

References

1880 births
1970 deaths
Footballers from Paisley, Renfrewshire
Scottish footballers
Association football inside forwards
Abercorn F.C. players
Heart of Midlothian F.C. players
Plymouth Argyle F.C. players
Rangers F.C. players
Portsmouth F.C. players
Fulham F.C. players
Leyton Orient F.C. players
Ton Pentre F.C. players
Scottish Football League players
Southern Football League players
Western Football League players
English Football League players
British Army personnel of World War I
Middlesex Regiment soldiers
Military personnel from Paisley, Renfrewshire